Clinothelphusa kakoota is a species of crab in the family Gecarcinucidae, which is endemic to Sri Lanka. Its natural habitats are subtropical or tropical moist lowland forests, subtropical or tropical swamps, and rivers. It is threatened by habitat loss, and is listed as a critically endangered species on the IUCN Red List. Its nearest relatives are another Sri Lankan endemic genus of crabs, Ceylonthelphusa.

References

Crustaceans of Sri Lanka
Gecarcinucidae
Freshwater crustaceans of Asia
Taxonomy articles created by Polbot